Alexander Austin Underwood (6 February 1878 – 28 November 1960) was an English professional footballer who played as an outside forward in the Football League for Glossop and Clapton Orient. He spent the majority of his career in the Southern League with Brentford, for whom he made over 170 appearances.

Career

Early years 
An outside forward, Underwood began his career with Bristol clubs Bristol St. George's and Bristol Rovers. He later moved to Southern League club Fulham, before signing for Grays United in July 1901 and then returning to Fulham on loan.

Brentford 
Underwood's signed for Southern League First Division club Brentford on 4 June 1902. He made 195 appearances in all competitions for the Bees and was awarded a benefit match upon his departure at the end of the 1907–08 season. He was posthumously inducted into the Brentford Hall of Fame in 2015.

Glossop 
Underwood moved up to the Football League and signed for Second Division club Glossop in May 1908. In February 1909, Underwood was part of the team which beat Sheffield Wednesday 1–0 in the third round of the FA Cup, which sent the Hillmen into the fourth round for the only time in the club's history. Glossop took eventual runners-up Bristol City to a replay in the fourth round and lost 1–0. He made 18 league appearances for Glossop.

Clapton Orient 
Underwood's final known club was Second Division club Clapton Orient, whom he joined in June 1909. He made 37 league appearances and scored one goal for the club.

Personal life 
After retiring from football, Underwood returned to Brentford and became a shoemaker.

Career statistics

Honours 
 Brentford Hall of Fame

References

English footballers
Brentford F.C. players
Glossop North End A.F.C. players
Leyton Orient F.C. players
English Football League players
Southern Football League players
1878 births
1960 deaths
Fulham F.C. players
Grays United F.C. players
People from Street, Somerset
Association football outside forwards
Association football midfielders

Bristol Rovers F.C. players